Waldorf Astoria Hotels & Resorts, formerly The Waldorf-Astoria Collection, is a luxury hotel and resort brand of Hilton Worldwide. It is positioned as the flagship brand within Hilton's portfolio, being used on hotels which offer the highest standards of facilities and service. As of December 31, 2019, it had 32 locations with 9,821 rooms in 15 countries and territories, including 2 that are owned or leased (with 463 rooms) and 30 that are managed (with 9,358 rooms).

History
In January 2006, Hilton Hotels Corporation announced that it would launch a luxury hotel chain called The Waldorf Astoria Collection, branded after its flagship Waldorf Astoria hotel in New York City.

In July 2009, the Dakota Mountain Lodge opened in Park City, Utah; it later dropped the "Dakota Mountain Lodge" title and is now known simply as Waldorf Astoria Park City. It is the first ski resort to join the portfolio. 

In January 2014, the Waldorf Astoria Dubai Palm Jumeirah opened in Dubai, on the Palm Jumeirah. 

In October 2014, Hilton Worldwide announced the sale of the Waldorf Astoria New York hotel to Chinese firm Anbang Insurance Group for $1.95 billion. The Hilton group continues to operate the hotel under a 100-year management contract with the buyer.

Properties

The following tables detail the properties of Waldorf Astoria Hotels & Resorts, in alphabetical order:

Ranking and awards
 7th best hotel in the world by the Conde Nast travellers' choice survey (2015) for the Waldorf Astoria in Jerusalem.

References

External links

Waldorf-Astoria
Luxury brands
Hotels established in 2006
Luxury hotels